Ikumi Iwabuchi (born 14 December 1995) is a Japanese handball player for Omron Corporation and the Japanese national team.

She represented Japan at the 2021 World Women's Handball Championship in Spain.

References

1995 births
Living people
Japanese female handball players